Robert Hughes (born 1 October 1986) is an English footballer who played in the Football League as a central midfielder for Nottingham Forest. He joined St Neots Town in September 2009.

Hughes began his career with Nottingham Forest and after several appearances in the reserves, made his Forest debut on 30 September 2006 as an 84th-minute substitute in a 3–1 win over Swansea City. He later made his full debut in the 2–1 Football League Trophy win over Gillingham. However, he was released at the end of the 2006–07 season, He then signed for Stamford, going on to play for clubs including Corby Town, Spalding United, Grantham Town, and St Neots Town.

References

External links
 

1986 births
Living people
English footballers
Association football midfielders
Nottingham Forest F.C. players
Stamford A.F.C. players
Corby Town F.C. players
Grantham Town F.C. players
St Neots Town F.C. players
English Football League players
Spalding United F.C. players